Acacia maranoensis, commonly known as womel, is a shrub of the genus Acacia and the subgenus Plurinerves that is endemic to an area in north eastern Australia.

Description
It has glabrous branchlets that are scurfy with deposits of white resin. Like most species of Acacia it has phyllodes rather than true leaves.

Taxonomy
The species was first formally described by the botanist Leslie Pedley in 1978 as part of the work A revision of Acacia Mill. in Queensland as published in the journal Austrobaileya. It was reclassified by Pedley as Racosperma maranoense in 1987 then transferred back to genus Acacia in 2001.

Distribution
The plant has a limited range in the Roma and Mitchell area of southern Queensland where it is found growing in texture contrast soils often as a part woodland communities featuring stands of Eucalyptus populnea. It is found in the Maranoa Region including around Morven and is also found to the west of Kingaroy. It is commonly situated on plains or flat terrain, that can be periodically inundated following rainfall events growing in dark brown, heavy clay loamy soils that usually are quite boggy once wet.

Uses
It can be used as a street tree and shade tree that has a fast growth rate and is tolerant of a light frost and drought. It can grow in a range of soils including soils that are mildly acidic or alkaline or enriched that are dry for extended periods to infrequently flooded.

See also
List of Acacia species

References

maranoensis
Flora of Queensland
Taxa named by Leslie Pedley
Plants described in 1978